Barbertonite is a magnesium chromium carbonate mineral with formula of . It is polymorphous with the mineral stichtite and, along with stichtite, is an alteration product of chromite in serpentinite. Barbertonite has a close association with stichtite, chromite, and antigorite (Taylor, 1973). Mills et al. (2011) presented evidence that barbertonite is a polytype of stichtite and should be discredited as a mineral species.

Barbertonite family group 
Barbertonite is a member of the hexagonal sjogrenite group along with manasseite  and sjogrenite  (Palache et al., 1944). These two isostructural groups are polymorphous in relation to each other (Palache et al., 1944).

Structure 
The structure of barbertonite has brucite-like layers alternating with interlayers. Neighboring brucite layers are stacked so that the hydroxyl ions are directly above one another (Taylor, 1973). In between brucite layers are interlayers containing  ions and  molecules (Taylor, 1973). Oxygen atoms are accommodated in a single set of sites distributed close to the axes that pass through the hydroxyl ions of adjacent brucite layers (Taylor, 1973).

Geologic occurrence 
Barbertonite was first found in the Barberton district in Transvaal, South Africa.  It can also be found in the Ag-Pb mine in Dumas, Tasmania, Australia (Anthony et al., 2003). Read and Dixon (1933) stated that the mineral that was found in Cunningsburgh, Shetland Islands was stichtite but it is now thought to be barbertonite because of the very similar indices of the minerals (Frondel et al. 1941). Barbertonite frequently occurs admixed with its rhombohedral analogue and as an alteration product of chromite in serpentinite (Anthony et al. 2003).

References

Further reading 

 Mondel, S. K., Baidya, T.K. (1996). Stichtite [Mg6Cr2(OH)16CO3·4H2O] in Nausahi ultramafites, Orissa, India – Its transformation at elevated temperatures. Mineralogical Magazine, 60, 836–840.
 Palache, C., Berman H., and Frondel C. (1944). Dana's System of Mineralogy, (7th Edition), v. 1, 659.

Magnesium minerals
Chromium minerals
Carbonate minerals
Hexagonal minerals
Minerals in space group 194
Polymorphism (materials science)